is the major-label debut EP by Japanese rock band Asian Kung-Fu Generation, released on November 25, 2002 on Under Flower Records.

Background
After six years since its inception and three independent releases, Asian Kung-Fu Generation contributed to the Under Flower compilation album, Whatch You Gonna Do?, before dropping their first major-label EP. The critically acclaimed mini-album topped the High Line Records weekly chart for two weeks straight and peaked at number thirty-five on the Oricon indies sales chart.  Due to its success, Hōkai Amplifier was re-released by Ki/oon Records on April 23, 2003. Although the mini-album didn't release any singles, the intro track "Haruka Kanata" enjoyed immense domestic and international popularity after it came to be used as the second opening theme for the anime series Naruto. In 2014, the album was released again as a 12-inch analog record.

Track listing

Personnel

Masafumi Gotoh – lead vocals, guitar, lyrics
Kensuke Kita – lead guitar, background vocals
Takahiro Yamada –  bass, background vocals
Kiyoshi Ijichi – drums
Kumiko Ishikawa – additional vocals
Asian Kung-Fu Generation/Katsuhisa Ogawa – producer

Jun-ya Iwata – engineering, mixing
Masato Wantanabe – mixing
Kazuhiro Yamagata – mastering
Kenichi Nakamura – recording 
Kanetsugu "Kan" Tanaka – directing
Yusuke Nakamura/KAN – art direction

Chart positions

References
CDJapan

Asian Kung-Fu Generation EPs
2002 debut EPs
Japanese-language EPs